Edwin Centeno (born June 27, 1981 in Chucuito, Puno Region, died March 20, 2010 in Puno, Puno Region) was a male race walker from Peru. He competed for his native country at the 2003 Pan American Games. He set his personal best (1:24:53) in the men's 20 km race walk in Lima on March 19, 2005.

Achievements

References

External links

1981 births
2010 deaths
Peruvian male racewalkers
Athletes (track and field) at the 2003 Pan American Games
Pan American Games competitors for Peru